Pedro Silva may refer to:

Pedro da Silva (post courier) (1647–1717), Portuguese-Canadian post courier
Pedro Silva (baseball) (1900–?), Cuban baseball player
Pedro Silva (Portuguese footballer) (fl. 1929-1934), Portuguese football half-back
Pedro de Silva (born 1945), Spanish politician and writer
Pedro da Silva (athlete) (born 1966), Brazilian decathlete 
Pedro Silva (swimmer) (born 1977), Portuguese freestyle swimmer
Pedro Silva (Brazilian footballer) (born 1981), Brazilian football defender
Pedro da Silva (canoeist) (born 1993), Brazilian canoeist
Pedro Silva (footballer, born 1997), Portuguese goalkeeper